Pete Sampras was the defending champion but did not participate in this edition.

Patrick McEnroe won in the final 6–2, 7–6(7–4) against Richard Fromberg.

Seeds
A champion seed is indicated in bold text while text in italics indicates the round in which that seed was eliminated.

  Marc Rosset (first round)
  Andrei Medvedev (second round)
  Thomas Muster (first round)
  Richard Krajicek (quarterfinals)
  Petr Korda (first round)
  Jacco Eltingh (first round)
  Andrea Gaudenzi (semifinals)
  Karel Nováček (second round)

Draw

References
 1995 Peters International Draw

Men's Singles
Singles